Colonel Thomas Cass may refer to:

 Thomas Cass (colonel)
 Statue of Thomas Cass, called Colonel Thomas Cass